The North, Central American and Caribbean section of the 1970 FIFA World Cup qualification acted as qualifiers for the 1970 FIFA World Cup in Mexico, for national teams which are members of the Confederation of North, Central American and Caribbean Association Football (CONCACAF). Twelve teams participated in the tournament to compete for one place in the final tournament.

Format
The qualification structure was as follows:
First round: The remaining 12 teams were divided into 4 groups of 3 teams each. The teams played against each other on a home-and-away basis. The group winners would advance to the semifinal round.
Second round: The 4 teams were paired up to play knockout matches on a home-and-away basis. The winners would advance to the Final Round.
Third round: The 2 teams played against each other on a home-and-away basis. The winner would qualify.

Entrants
Twelve national teams entered into CONCACAF qualification. Another team, Cuba, had their entry rejected.

First round

Group 1

United States advanced to the semifinal round.

Group 2

Haiti advanced to the semifinal round.

Group 3

Honduras advanced to the semifinal round.

Group 4

El Salvador advanced to the semifinal round.

Second round

Group 1

Haiti advanced to the Final Round.

Group 2

Play-off
El Salvador and Honduras finished level on points, and a play-off on neutral ground was played to decide who would advance to the Final Round.

El Salvador advanced to the Final Round. Additionally, these matches featured prominently in the Football War.

Third round

Play-off
El Salvador and Haiti finished level on points, and a play-off on neutral ground was played to decide who would qualify.

El Salvador qualified.

Qualified teams
The following two teams from CONCACAF qualified for the final tournament.

Goalscorers

Notes

References

External links
 FIFA World Cup Official Site – 1970 World Cup Qualification
 RSSSF – 1970 World Cup Qualification

CONCACAF
FIFA World Cup qualification (CONCACAF)